Stanthorpe Airport  is located at  Applethorpe to the immediate north of Stanthorpe, Southern Downs Region, Queensland, Australia.

See also
 List of airports in Queensland

References

Airports in Queensland